Narasapur  may refer to places in India:

Geography
 Narasapuram, West Godavari district,  Andhra Pradesh; also called Narsapur 
 Narsapur, Peddapalli district, a village in Peddapalli district, Telangana
 Narsapur, Medak district, a village in Medak district, Telangana
 Narsapur, Nalgonda district, a village in Nalgonda district, Telangana
 Narsapur, Adilabad district, a village in Adilabad district, Telangana
 Narsapur, Karnataka
 Narasapur, Belgaum

Politics
 Narsapur (Assembly constituency)